Daily Radar was a news aggregator and portal site for Future US's male-oriented content, including sports, film and television, and video games.
Daily Radar started as a gaming website like IGN, GameSpy and GameSpot, and was later renamed and relaunched in the UK as GamesRadar. The site was run by Imagine Media (now Future) and consisted of many editors that contributed to Imagine's print publications. A victim of the dot-com bubble burst, Imagine closed Daily Radar in 2001, weeks shy of E3. The Washington Post later noted that Daily Radar was among multiple "popular video-game news sites" to close in 2001, alongside CNET Gamecenter.

Popular culture 

Its name has since been the inspiration for the name of a satirical website, The Daily Raider. It has also been the subject of jokes in the webcomic Penny Arcade.

The website was mentioned on the television show Whose Line is it Anyway? when one of the reviewers employed by the website was sung to by Wayne Brady in the style of Britney Spears.

Nintendo lawsuit and closure

Daily Radar was the center of a lawsuit brought against its parent company, Imagine Media by Nintendo. Nintendo alleged that The Daily Radar used Pokémon images and the name "Pokemon" in their publication "100% Unofficial Pokémon Trainer's Guide". In response, Daily Radar ceased all reporting on Nintendo in January 2001. Four months later, on May 1, 2001, Imagine Media shut down The Daily Radar.

On August 23, 2010, Daily Radar's website and all sub-sites (BallHype, ShowHype and several Daily Radar Blips sites) were replaced with a notice that they were "no longer being supported." Today URLs for Daily Radar redirect to the website TechRadar instead.

References

External links
Wayback link for Daily Radar (US site)
Wayback link for Daily Radar (UK site)
Wayback link for Imagine Publishing
The Slow And Painful Death Of Imagine Media
Imagine Media Ltd acquired by Fresca Web Management Ltd (google cache, the real webpage is down as of 6/22/05)
Editorial: Imagine Media, Victims?!?
One of the many Penny Arcade comics attacking Daily Radar
A Tribute to The Daily Radar

Video game news websites
Internet properties disestablished in 2001
Defunct websites